Ghezzano is a village in Tuscany, central Italy, administratively a frazione of the comune of San Giuliano Terme, province of Pisa. At the time of the 2001 census its population was 3,689.

Ghezzano is about 5 km from San Giuliano Terme.

References 

Frazioni of the Province of Pisa